The 1917 Mare Island Marines football team represented the United States Marine Corps stationed at the Mare Island Naval Shipyard in Vallejo, California, during the 1917 college football season. The team compiled an 8–0 record, won the 1918 Rose Bowl, shut out six opponents, and outscored all opponents by a combined total of 200 to 10.

Schedule

References

Mare Island Marines
Mare Island Marines football seasons
Rose Bowl champion seasons
College football undefeated seasons
Mare Island Marines football